Alan Ainslie (born 1947) is a former Australian professional soccer player who played as a midfielder and forward for Berwick Rangers, Western Suburbs, Sydney Olympic and the Australia national soccer team.

International career
Ainslie played for Australia and played four international friendlies with one goal against Israel.

Career statistics

Club

International

References

External links
Alan Ainslie at Aussie Footballers

1947 births
Living people
Australian soccer players
Association football midfielders
Association football forwards
A
A
National Soccer League (Australia) players
Australia international soccer players